Braggtown is an album released by The Branford Marsalis Quartet in 2006.

The album, following the 2004 Grammy-nominated Eternal, draws upon a world of inspirations, including John Coltrane, a 17th-century English composer, an American Indian Warrior and a Japanese horror film. Marsalis chose some of the new songs from the band's current repertoire, with an emphasis on what he describes as "that kind of high-energy music we've been playing in live performance."

This album was named after Braggtown, a neighborhood located in the northeastern corner of Durham, North Carolina, as Marsalis has been a resident of the Durham area for the past few years.

The cover of the album shows the four musicians in a locker room in the baseball stadium Durham Bulls Athletic Park.

Track listing 
 "Jack Baker" (Branford Marsalis) - 14:12 
 "Hope" (Joey Calderazzo) - 11:01 
 "Fate" (Marsalis) - 08:24 
 "Blakzilla" (Jeff "Tain" Watts) - 12:40 
 "O Solitude" (Henry Purcell) - 07:48 
 "Sir Roderick, the Aloof" (Marsalis) - 05:45 
 "Black Elk Speaks" (Eric Revis) - 14:10

Personnel 
 Branford Marsalis – saxophones
 Joey Calderazzo - piano
 Eric Revis - bass
 Jeff "Tain" Watts - drums

Charts 
 2006 Top Jazz Albums # 14

References

External links 
 Braggtown at BranfordMarsalis.com

2006 albums
Branford Marsalis albums
Marsalis Music albums